The Oesterreichische Nationalbank (OeNB) is the central bank of Austria and, as such, an integral part of both the European System of Central Banks (ESCB) and the Eurozone. In the public interest, the Oesterreichische Nationalbank contributes to monetary and economic policy decision-making in Austria and in the Euro area. In line with the Federal Act on the Oesterreichische Nationalbank, the OeNB is a stock corporation. Given its status as a central bank, it is, however, governed by a number of special provisions, as laid down in the Nationalbank Act. The OeNB's capital totals €12 million and is held by a sole shareholder, the federal government. The shareholder rights of the federal government are exercised by the Minister of Finance. Since May 2010, this capital is entirely held by the Austrian state. Previously half of the capital was in the hands of employer and employee organizations as well as banks and insurance corporations. Until January 1999, when Austria adopted the euro, the bank was responsible for the former national currency, the Austrian schilling.

History

Tasks and composition

The main tasks of the OeNB center on contributing to a stability-oriented monetary policy within the Eurozone, safeguarding financial stability in Austria and supplying the general public and the business community in Austria with high-quality, i.e. counterfeit-proof, cash. In addition, the OeNB manages reserve assets, i.e. gold and foreign exchange holdings, with a view to backing the euro in times of crisis, draws up economic analyses, compiles statistical data, is active in international organizations and is responsible for payment systems oversight.  Furthermore, the OeNB operates a payment system for the euro, promotes knowledge and understanding among the general public and decision makers owing to its comprehensive communication policy, and supports research in Austria.

Presidents/Governors

See also

Economy of Austria
Euro
Austrian schilling

External links 
 Oesterreichische Nationalbank

References

European System of Central Banks
Austria
Banking in Austria
Buildings and structures in Alsergrund
Banks established in 1816
1816 establishments in the Austrian Empire
Francis II, Holy Roman Emperor
19th-century architecture in Austria